Meira is a municipality in Galicia, Spain.

Meira may also refer to:
 Meira (comarca), a comarca in Galicia, Spain
 Meira (weevil), a beetle genus in the tribe Peritelini
 Meira (yeast genus), a mite-associated basidiomycete yeast with three recently described species, placed in Class Exobasidiomycetes (Ustilaginomycotina)

People with the surname
 Fernando Meira (born 1978), a Portuguese football player
 Mateus Meira Rita, a São Toméan politician
 Sérgio Meira, a Brazilian linguist
 Silvio Meira, a Brazilian computer scientist
 Tarcísio Meira (1935–2021), a Brazilian actor
 Vítor Meira (born 1977), a Brazilian auto racing driver

People with the first name
 Meira Kumar (born 1945), an Indian politician and Member of Parliament, who was the first elected woman Speaker of the Lok Sabha.

See also
 Meira Oy, a Finnish spice and coffee company

Portuguese-language surnames